Vitaliy Koltsov (born 20 March 1994) is a Ukrainian football midfielder.

Career
Koltsov is a product of the FC Nyva Vinnytsia and FC Shakhtar Donetsk youth sportive schools.

From July 2015 to June 2017, he went on loan for the Ukrainian First League club FC Illichivets Mariupol.

References

External links
 
 

Ukrainian footballers
Ukrainian expatriate footballers
Association football midfielders
1994 births
Living people
FC Shakhtar-3 Donetsk players
FC Mariupol players
FC Oleksandriya players
FC Olimpik Donetsk players
FC Metalist 1925 Kharkiv players
FC SKA-Khabarovsk players
Ukrainian Premier League players
Russian First League players
Expatriate footballers in Russia
Ukrainian expatriate sportspeople in Russia
Ukraine youth international footballers
Sportspeople from Vinnytsia Oblast